Charles E. Harwood (March 6, 1851 – April 7, 1924) was a Massachusetts politician who served as the 26th Mayor of Lynn, Massachusetts.  Harwood as born in Charlestown, Massachusetts to Jesse Harwood and Mary A. (Lindston) Harwood on March 6, 1851.

Harwood was born in Charlestown, Massachusetts on March 6, 1851, to Jesse Harwood and Mary A. (Lyndston) Harwood.

1898 Congressional Race
In 1898 Harwood ran for the Republican nomination of the Massachusetts's 7th congressional district, losing to future Congressman Ernest W. Roberts.

References

 Municipal History of Essex County in Massachusetts p. 324 (1922).

Notes

1851 births
1924 deaths
Mayors of Lynn, Massachusetts
Massachusetts Republicans